The 2015 Money in the Bank was the sixth annual Money in the Bank professional wrestling pay-per-view and livestreaming  event produced by WWE. It took place on June 14, 2015, at the Nationwide Arena in Columbus, Ohio. It was the first WWE pay-per-view event that was held in Columbus since 2004's Bad Blood. Money in the Bank was available for free to new subscribers as part of a free-trial to WWE's streaming service, the WWE Network, in over 140 countries.

Seven matches were contested at the event, including one match on the Kickoff pre-show. The titular ladder match for the Money in the Bank contract was won by Sheamus. In the main event, Seth Rollins retained the WWE World Heavyweight Championship in a ladder match against Dean Ambrose. In other prominent matches, WWE United States Champion John Cena defeated NXT Champion Kevin Owens in a non-title match and The Prime Time Players (Darren Young and Titus O'Neil) defeated The New Day (Big E and Xavier Woods) to win the WWE Tag Team Championship.

The event had 57,000 buys (excluding WWE Network views), down from the previous year's 122,000 buys.

Production

Background 
Money in the Bank is an annual gimmick pay-per-view (PPV) and WWE Network event produced by WWE since 2010, generally held between June and July. The concept of the show comes from WWE's established Money in the Bank ladder match, in which multiple wrestlers use ladders to retrieve a briefcase hanging above the ring. The briefcase contains a contract that guarantees the winner a match for a world championship at any time within the next year. For 2015, the winner received a contract for a WWE World Heavyweight Championship match. The 2015 event was the sixth event in the Money in the Bank chronology and it took place on June 14, 2015, at the Nationwide Arena in Columbus, Ohio. It was also the first WWE pay-per-view event that was held in Columbus since 2004's Bad Blood. To promote the WWE Network, Money in the Bank was available for free to new subscribers in over 140 countries.

Storylines 
The card consisted of seven matches, including one on the Kickoff pre-show, that resulted from scripted storylines, where wrestlers portrayed villains, heroes, or less distinguishable characters in scripted events that built tension and culminated in a wrestling match or series of matches, with results predetermined by WWE's writers. Storylines were produced on WWE's weekly television shows, Raw and SmackDown.

After Kevin Owens defeated John Cena at Elimination Chamber, a rematch was scheduled for Money in the Bank.

At Elimination Chamber, Dolph Ziggler, Neville, Roman Reigns, Randy Orton, Kofi Kingston and Sheamus were revealed at the contestants in the Money in the Bank ladder match, in which the winner wins a contract for a WWE World Heavyweight Championship match at any time within the next year. On the June 4th episode of SmackDown, Kane was added to the match.

Also at Elimination Chamber, Dean Ambrose defeated WWE World Heavyweight Champion Seth Rollins by disqualification. Though Rollins remained champion, Ambrose took the title belt with him. On the June 1st episode of Raw, Roman Reigns, speaking on Ambrose's behalf, challenged Rollins to a ladder match for the title at Money in the Bank, which Rollins accepted.

On the June 4th episode of SmackDown, The Prime Time Players defeated The Ascension and The Lucha Dragons in a triple threat tag team match to become the #1 contenders to face The New Day for the WWE Tag Team Championship at the event.

At Elimination Chamber, Ryback captured the vacant Intercontinental Championship in an Elimination Chamber match. On the June 1 episode of Raw, before Ryback was scheduled to defend the title against The Miz, Big Show attacked Miz and confronted Ryback. On June 8, Ryback was scheduled to defend the title against Big Show at the event.

On the June 1 episode of Raw, Nikki Bella retained the Divas Championship against Paige after Brie Bella switched with Nikki during the match and pinned Paige. On June 8, a rematch was scheduled for Money In The Bank.

At Elimination Chamber, R-Truth eliminated King Barrett during the Elimination Chamber match for the Intercontinental Championship. On the June 8 episode of Raw, a match between Truth and Barrett was set for the Money In The Bank preshow.

Event

Pre-show 
On the Money in the Bank Kickoff pre-show, R-Truth faced King Barrett. R-Truth pinned Barrett with a schoolboy to win the match.

Preliminary matches 
The actual pay-per-view opened with the roster at the entrance stage for a 10-bell salute to Dusty Rhodes, who died before the event.

The first match was the Money in the Bank ladder match involving Roman Reigns, Sheamus, Randy Orton, Dolph Ziggler (with Lana), Neville, Kofi Kingston, and Kane. Near the climax of the match, it seemed that Reigns was going to claim the briefcase until Bray Wyatt emerged and attacked him, preventing him from retrieving the briefcase. The end of the match saw Sheamus throwing Neville off the ladder and retrieving the briefcase thus winning the match.

Next, Nikki Bella defended the WWE Divas Championship against Paige. Halfway through the match, Paige executed a "Ram-Paige" for a near-fall. As the referee was focusing on Paige, Nikki then switched places with her sister Brie (who was hiding under the ring). Paige secured a roll-up victory for the win and the championship. A surprised Paige thought that she had won until Brie revealed her face to the referee. The match was continued and Nikki executed a "Rack Attack" on Paige to score a pinfall.

In the third match, Ryback defended the WWE Intercontinental Championship against Big Show. The Miz was on commentary for the match. Near the end of the match, Show executed a "Knockout Punch" on Ryback who rolled out the ring. As Show rolled Ryback in for the pin, Miz attacked Show, causing a disqualification.

After this, NXT Champion Kevin Owens wrestled WWE United States Champion John Cena. The match went back and forth with a lot of counters and finishers. Owens mocked Cena with his "you can't see me" gesture, but Cena responded with the same move. Owens executed a pop-up powerbomb for a two count while Cena responded with an "Attitude Adjustment" (AA) for a two count. Cena executed another "AA" for another two count. Cena eventually executed a third AA for the decisive pin. After the match, Owens powerbombed Cena on the ring apron and walked off.

In the penultimate match, The New Day (Big E and Xavier Woods) defended the WWE Tag Team Championship against The Prime Time Players (Titus O'Neil and Darren Young). O'Neil won the match for his team by pinning Woods after a "Clash of the Titus" to win the titles.

Main event 
In the main event, Seth Rollins defended the WWE World Heavyweight Championship against Dean Ambrose in a ladder match. Ambrose executed "Dirty Deeds" on Rollins on the Spanish announce table. The climax saw both Ambrose and Rollins jostle atop the ladders for the championship. The championship was accidentally unhooked and as Rollins and Ambrose came crashing down, it was Rollins who held onto the title, thereby winning the match and retaining the title.

Aftermath
After retaining the WWE World Heavyweight Championship, Seth Rollins celebrated on the following night episode of Raw by renaming it "Monday Night Rollins", before being interrupted and attacked by Dean Ambrose, forcing Rollins to retreat. Ambrose then sat on a steel chair in the ring waiting for Rollins to return, but instead ended up facing Sheamus, whom he defeated thanks to a distraction by Randy Orton. Orton attacked Sheamus after the match leading to a feud between the two headed into both Battleground and SummerSlam. Later that night, Triple H revealed that Seth Rollins' next challenger for the WWE World Heavyweight Championship at Battleground would be Brock Lesnar, who return from his suspension and his rematch clause for the title has been accepted by The Authority doing it on Seth's behalf. At Battleground, The Undertaker returned and attacked Lesnar, beating Rollins via disqualification, costing Lesnar his chance to win the title back.

After feeling humiliated following his loss to John Cena, Kevin Owens challenged Cena to a match for the WWE United States Championship at Battleground, which Cena accepted on the June 22 episode of Raw. At The Beast in the East, Owens lost the NXT Championship to Finn Bálor. At Battleground, Cena retained the United States Championship to end their feud.

After the WWE Intercontinental Championship match that has ended on a disqualification, a triple threat match between Ryback, Big Show and The Miz for the Intercontinental championship was scheduled for Battleground. However, Ryback had suffered a Staph Infection on his right knee, which caused the match to be cancelled. Ryback would later recover and the match was rescheduled for SummerSlam, where Ryback would retain his title after pinning The Miz.

On the July 13 episode of Raw Stephanie McMahon confronted Team Bella with Paige and announced a "Divas revolution" by introducing the NXT wrestlers Charlotte, Becky Lynch and NXT Women's champion Sasha Banks into the roster, where McMahon had Charlotte and Lynch team with Paige to become Team PCB and Sasha Banks team with Naomi and Tamina to become Team B.A.D. The two teams then brawled with Team Bella. At Battleground, Charlotte (who was representing Team PCB) defeated Brie Bella of Team Bella and Sasha Banks of Team B.A.D in a triple threat match.

Sheamus twice tried to cash-in his Money in the Bank contract on Seth Rollins for a WWE World Heavyweight Championship match but his attempts were denied, first by Randy Orton as payback for costing him a title match by disqualification against Rollins on August 10 episode of Raw and the second by Kane after Rollins retained his title against Sting at Night of Champions. However, Rollins vacated the title on November 4, after suffering multiple knee injuries at a live event in Dublin, Ireland. Sheamus would eventually cash-in his contract on Roman Reigns after the latter won the vacant WWE World Heavyweight Championship at Survivor Series and pinned him to win the title, joining the Authority in the process.

Results

References

External links 

2015
Events in Columbus, Ohio
2015 in Ohio
2015 WWE Network events
Professional wrestling in Columbus, Ohio
2015 WWE pay-per-view events
June 2015 events in the United States